Idiomarina insulisalsae is a Gram-negative, aerobic and halophilic bacterium from the genus of Idiomarina which has been isolated from a sea salt evaporation pond from the Island of Sal.

References

Bacteria described in 2010
Alteromonadales